Simniinae is a subfamily of molluscs in the Ovulidae family of gastropods.

Genera
Depending on authority, it contains between 7 and 12 genera (see genus list at Ovulidae).
 Contrasimnia Lorenz & Fehse, 2009
 Cymbovula C. N. Cate, 1973
 Cyphoma Röding, 1798
 Dissona C. N. Cate, 1973
 Naviculavolva Lorenz & Fehse, 2009
 Neosimnia P. Fischer, 1884
 Quasisimnia Lorenz & Fehse, 2009
 Simnia Risso, 1826
 Simnialena C. N. Cate, 1973
Genera  brought into synonymy
 Cymbula C. N. Cate, 1973: synonym of Cymbovula C. N. Cate, 1973 (invalid: junior homonym of Cymbula H. Adams & A. Adams, 1854; Cymbovula is a replacement name)
 Pseudocyphoma C. N. Cate, 1973: synonym of Cyphoma Röding, 1798
 Spiculata C. N. Cate, 1973: synonym of Simnia Risso, 1826
 Subsimnia C. N. Cate, 1973: synonym of Simnia Risso, 1826
 Velox Monterosato, 1878: synonym of Volva Röding, 1798 (probably a misprint of Volva)
 Xandarovula C. N. Cate, 1973: synonym of Simnia Risso, 1826

References 

Ovulidae